The following entries cover events related to the study of paleontology which occurred in the listed year.

17th century – 18th century – 19th century – 20th $#1776century– 1st century



17th century
1600 1601 1602 1603 1604 1605 1606 1607 1608 16091610 1611 1612 1613 1614 1615 1616 1617 1618 1619
1620 1621 1622 1623 1624 1625 1626 1627 1628 16291630 1631 1632 1633 1634 1635 1636 1637 1638 1639
1640   1641 1642 1643 1644 1645 1646 1647 1648 1649
1650 1651 1652 1653 1654 1655 1656 1657 1658 1659
1660 1661 1662 1663 1664 1665   1666 1667 1668 1669
1670   1671   1672 1673 1674 1675 1676   1677   1678 1679
1680 1681 1682 1683 1684 1685 1686 1687 1688 1689
1690 1691 1692 1693 1694 1695   1696   1697 1698   1699

18th century
1700 1701 1702 1703 1704  1705  1706 1707 1708 17091710 1711 1712 1713 1714 1715 1716 1717 1718 1719
1720 1721 1722 1723 1724 1725 1726 1727  1728   1729
1730 1731 1732 1733 1734 1735 1736 1737 1738 1739
1740 1741 1742 1743 1744 1745 1746 1747 1748 1749
1750 1751 1752 1753 1754  1755   1756 1757   1758   1759
1760 1761 1762 1763   1764 1765 1766 1767 1768   1769
1770 1771 1772 1773   1774 1775   1776   1777   1778   1779
1780 1781 1782 1783   1784   1785 1786   1787   1788 1789
1790   1791 1792   1793   1794   1795 1796 1797 1798 1799

19th century
1800  1801  1802  1803  1804  1805  1806  1807  1808  18091810  1811   1812   1813   1814   1815   1816   1817   1818   1819
1820   1821   1822   1823   1824   1825   1826   1827   1828   1829
1830   1831   1832   1833   1834   1835   1836   1837   1838   1839
1840   1841   1842   1843   1844   1845   1846   1847   1848   1849
1850   1851   1852  1853   1854   1855   1856   1857   1858   1859
1860   1861   1862   1863   1864   1865   1866   1867   1868   1869
1870   1871   1872   1873   1874   1875   1876   1877   1878   1879
1880   1881   1882   1883   1884   1885   1886   1887   1888   1889
1890   1891   1892   1893   1894   1895   1896   1897   1898   1899

20th century
1900   1901   1902   1903   1904   1905   1906   1907   1908   1909
1910   1911   1912   1913   1914   1915   1916   1917   1918   1919
1920   1921   1922   1923   1924   1925   1926   1927   1928   1929
1930   1931   1932   1933   1934   1935   1936   1937   1938   1939
1940   1941   1942   1943   1944   1945   1946   1947   1948   1949
1950   1951   1952   1953   1954   1955   1956   1957   1958   1959
1960   1961   1962   1963   1964   1965   1966   1967   1968   1969
1970   1971   1972   1973   1974   1975   1976   1977   1978   1979
1980   1981   1982   1983   1984   1985   1986   1987   1988   1989
1990   1991   1992   1993   1994   1995   1996   1997   1998   1999

21st century
2000   2001   2002   2003    2004   2005
2006   2007   2008   20092010   2011   2012   2013   2014   2015    2016   2017   2018   20192020    2021   2022 2023

References

 
Paleontology